The Africa T20 Cup was a Twenty20 cricket tournament organised by Cricket South Africa. It featured a combination of South African provincial teams and teams representing other African countries, including Kenya, Namibia, and Zimbabwe. It ran for four years before being replaced by the CSA Provincial T20 Cup.

The first edition of the tournament was played in September and October 2015, as a precursor to the 2015–16 South African domestic season. It was won by Northerns, which defeated KwaZulu-Natal Inland in the final by seven wickets. The second edition of the tournament was played in September and October 2016. It was won by Eastern Province, who defeated Northern Cape in the final by 31 runs.

Background
The Africa T20 Cup has been characterised as "essentially a showcase in cricket development". The South African teams have various restrictions on the composition of their squads – they had to feature no more than four players from the professional franchises, at least two players under the age of 21, and at least six players of colour (including at least three Black Africans). The Africa T20 Cup partially filled the gap left in the South African calendar by the cancellation of the Champions League Twenty20. The SuperSport television network, a major sponsor of Cricket South Africa, was the tournament's broadcaster.

Expansion
In 2016, it was suggested that the Africa T20 Cup would be expanded in the future to include other African countries, such as Uganda. For the 2018 edition, the number of teams was increased from 16 to 20, with the addition of the South African teams of Limpopo and Mpumalanga, along with national representation from Ghana and Nigeria. However, Ghana declined Cricket South Africa's invite to compete in the tournament, and were replaced by Uganda.

Results

Teams

 Boland
 Border
 Eastern Province
 Easterns
 Free State
 Gauteng
 Kenya
 KwaZulu-Natal
 KwaZulu-Natal Inland
 Limpopo

 Mpumalanga
 Namibia
 Nigeria
 Northern Cape
 Northerns
 North West
 South Western Districts
 Uganda
 Western Province
 Zimbabwe/Zimbabwe Development XI

See also
 CSA Provincial Competitions
 Ram Slam T20 Challenge

References

 
South African domestic cricket competitions
International cricket competitions in South Africa
Twenty20 cricket leagues
2015 establishments in Africa
Recurring sporting events established in 2015
Sports leagues established in 2015